Ōmagari Station is the name of two train stations in Japan:

 Ōmagari Station (Akita)
 Ōmagari Station (Aomori)